Tillandsia parryi is a species of flowering plant in the family Bromeliaceae. This species is endemic to Mexico.

References

parryi
Flora of Mexico
Taxa named by John Gilbert Baker